John Arundell (died 15 September 1580), of Trerice in Cornwall, was a Member of Parliament for Mitchell, Cornwall, in 1555 and 1558, and was High Sheriff of Cornwall in 1573–1574.

Origins
He was the second son and heir of Sir John Arundell (1495–1561), of Trerice, nicknamed "Tilbury Jack" (or "Jack of Tilbury"), a commander of the Royal Navy during the reigns of Kings Henry VIII and Edward VI and twice Sheriff of Cornwall, by his second wife Juliana Erisey (or Erissey), daughter of James Erisey (or Erissey) of Erisey and widow of a certain Gourlyn.

Career

He was a retiring figure for much of his life and less celebrated than either his father, "Jack of Tilbury", or his son, Sir John Arundell, nicknamed "Jack for the King". He was twice a Member of Parliament for the pocket borough of Mitchell, Cornwall, in 1555 and 1558, and was High Sheriff of Cornwall in 1573–1574.

Marriages and children
He was married twice:
Firstly to Catherine Coswarth, daughter of John Coswarth and widow of Alan Hill, by whom he had four daughters:
Juliana Arundell (born 1563), who married Richard Carew (1555–1620), the historian of Cornwall, author of the Survey of Cornwall.
Alice Arundell (born 1564), wife of Henry Somaster (d. 1606) of Painsford in the parish of Ashprington, Devon.
Dorothy Arundell (born 1566), wife of Edward Coswarth of Coswarth.
Mary Arundell (born 1568), wife of Oliver Dynham.
Secondly he married Gertrude Denys, a daughter of Sir Robert Denys (died 1592) of Holcombe Burnell in Devon, by his first wife Mary Mountjoy (a first cousin to Lady Jane Grey and second cousin to Elizabeth I, Mary I and Edward VI through their common ancestor Queen Elizabeth Woodville]), a daughter of William Blount, 4th Baron Mountjoy (1478–1534), by his fourth wife Dorothy Grey, daughter of Thomas Grey, 1st Marquess of Dorset. Gertrude survived her husband and remarried to Edward, Lord Morley. Her will is housed in the National Archives as "Will of Gertrude Morley, Widow of Trerise" 1635. By Gertrude he had at least eight children including: 
Ann Arundell (born 1574), wife of William Carnsew of Buckelly (Bokelly).
John Arundell (born 1575), died in infancy
Sir John Arundell (1576 – c. 1656), eldest son and heir, of Trerice, nicknamed "Jack-for-the-King", MP for Cornwall and for Tregony and Governor of Pendennis Castle, Falmouth, during the Civil War  
Thomas Arundell (born 1577) of Duloe, MP for West Looe, a soldier who served in the Netherlands.
Catherine Arundell (born 1580), wife of John St Aubin of Clowans (St Aubyn of Clowance).

See also

 Arundell family

Notes

Sources
Vivian, J. L., ed. (1887). "The Visitations of Cornwall: comprising the Heralds' Visitations of 1530, 1573 & 1620"; with additions by J. L. Vivian. Exeter: W. Pollard, p. 12, Pedigree of Arundell of Trerice 
'Burke's Extinct Peerage'' (London: Henry Colburn & Richard Bentley, 1831)

|-

1580 deaths
Year of birth missing
Members of the Parliament of England for Mitchell
High Sheriffs of Cornwall
John (1580)
16th-century English landowners
English MPs 1555
English MPs 1558